Apotheosis, also called divinization or deification, is the glorification of a subject to divine levels and, commonly, the treatment of a human being, any other living thing, or an abstract idea in the likeness of a deity. The term has meanings in theology, where it refers to a belief, and in art, where it refers to a genre.

In theology, apotheosis refers to the idea that an individual has been raised to godlike stature. In art, the term refers to the treatment of any subject (a figure, group, locale, motif, convention or melody) in a particularly grand or exalted manner.

Ancient Near East

Before the Hellenistic period, imperial cults were known in Ancient Egypt (pharaohs) and Mesopotamia (from Naram-Sin through Hammurabi). In the New Kingdom of Egypt, all deceased pharaohs were deified as the god Osiris. The architect Imhotep was deified after his death.

Ancient Greece

From at least the Geometric period of the ninth century BC, the long-deceased heroes linked with founding myths of Greek sites were accorded chthonic rites in their heroon, or "hero-temple".

In the Greek world, the first leader who accorded himself divine honours was Philip II of Macedon. At his wedding to his sixth wife, Philip's enthroned image was carried in procession among the Olympian gods; "his example at Aigai became a custom, passing to the Macedonian kings who were later worshipped in Greek Asia, from them to Julius Caesar and so to the emperors of Rome". Such Hellenistic state leaders might be raised to a status equal to the gods before death (e.g., Alexander the Great) or afterwards (e.g., members of the
Ptolemaic dynasty). A heroic cult status similar to apotheosis was also an honour given to a few revered artists of the distant past, notably Homer.

Archaic and Classical Greek hero-cults became primarily civic, extended from their familial origins, in the sixth century; by the fifth century none of the worshipers based their authority by tracing descent back to the hero, with the exception of some families who inherited particular priestly cults, such as the Eumolpides (descended from Eumolpus) of the Eleusinian mysteries, and some inherited priesthoods at oracle sites. The Greek hero cults can be distinguished on the other hand from the Roman cult of dead emperors, because the hero was not thought of as having ascended to Olympus or become a god: he was beneath the earth, and his power purely local.  For this reason, hero cults were chthonic in nature, and their rituals more closely resembled those for Hecate and Persephone than those for Zeus and Apollo. Two exceptions were Heracles and Asclepius, who might be honoured as either gods or heroes, sometimes by chthonic night-time rites and sacrifice on the following day. One god considered as a hero to mankind is Prometheus, he secretly stole fire from Mt Olympus and introduced it to mankind.

Ancient Rome

Up to the end of the Republic, the god Quirinus was the only one the Romans accepted as having undergone apotheosis, for his identification/syncretism with Romulus. (See Euhemerism). Subsequently, apotheosis in ancient Rome was a process whereby a deceased ruler was recognized as having been divine by his successor, usually also by a decree of the Senate and popular consent. In addition to showing respect, often the present ruler deified a popular predecessor to legitimize himself and gain popularity with the people. The upper-class did not always take part in the imperial cult, and some privately ridiculed the apotheosis of inept and feeble emperors, as in the satire The Pumpkinification of (the Divine) Claudius, usually attributed to Seneca.

At the height of the imperial cult during the Roman Empire, sometimes the emperor's deceased loved ones—heirs, empresses, or lovers, as Hadrian's Antinous—were deified as well. Deified people were awarded posthumously the title Divus (Diva if women) to their names to signify their divinity. Traditional Roman religion distinguished between a deus (god) and a divus (a mortal who became divine or deified), though not consistently. Temples and columns were erected to provide a space for worship.

In the Roman story Cupid and Psyche, Zeus gives the ambrosia of the gods to the mortal Psyche, transforming her into a goddess herself.

Ancient China
The Ming dynasty epic Investiture of the Gods deals heavily with deification legends. Numerous mortals have been deified into the Taoist pantheon, such as Guan Yu, Iron-crutch Li and Fan Kuai. Song Dynasty General Yue Fei was deified during the Ming Dynasty and is considered by some practitioners to be one of the three highest-ranking heavenly generals.

Ancient India, Southeast Asia and North Korea
Various Hindu and Buddhist rulers in the past have been represented as deities, especially after death, from India to Indonesia.

The founder of North Korea Kim Il-Sung instituted worship of himself amongst the citizens and is considered the only current country to deify its ruler. Deceased North Korean leader Kim Il-Sung is the principal object of the North Korean cult of personality in which he is treated similarly to an explicitly apotheosized leader, with statues of and monuments dedicated to the "Eternal President", the annual commemoration of his birth, the paying of respects by newlyweds to his nearest statue, and the North Korean calendar being a Juche calendar based on Kim Il-sung's date of birth.

Christianity

Instead of the word "apotheosis", Christian theology uses in English the words "deification" or "divinization" or the Greek word "theosis". Pre-Reformation and mainstream theology, in both East and West, views Jesus Christ as the preexisting God who undertook mortal existence, not as a mortal being who attained divinity. It holds that he has made it possible for human beings to be raised to the level of sharing the divine nature as 2 Peter 1:4 states "He became human to make humans "partakers of the divine nature" In John 10:34, Jesus referenced Psalm 82:6 when he stated “Is it not written in your Law, I have said you are gods?" Other authors stated: "For this is why the Word became man, and the Son of God became the Son of man: so that man, by entering into communion with the Word and thus receiving divine sonship, might become a son of God." "For He was made man that we might be made God." "The only-begotten Son of God, wanting to make us sharers in his divinity, assumed our nature, so that he, made man, might make men gods." 
Accusations of self deification to some degree may have been placed upon heretical groups such as the Waldensians.

The Westminster Dictionary of Christian Theology, authored by Anglican Priest Alan Richardson, contains the following in an article titled "Deification":

Roman Catholic Church
The Roman Catholic Church does not use the term "apotheosis".

Corresponding to the Greek word theosis are the Latin-derived words "divinization" and "deification" used in the parts of the Catholic Church that are of Latin tradition. The concept has been given less prominence in Western theology than in that of the Eastern Catholic Churches, but is present in the Latin Church's liturgical prayers, such as that of the deacon or priest when pouring wine and a little water into the chalice: "By the mystery of this water and wine may we come to share in the divinity of Christ who humbled himself to share in our humanity." 

Catholic theology stresses the concept of supernatural life, "a new creation and elevation, a rebirth, it is a participation in and partaking of the divine nature" (cf. ). In Catholic teaching there is a vital distinction between natural life and supernatural life, the latter being "the life that God, in an act of love, freely gives to human beings to elevate them above their natural lives" and which they receive through prayer and the sacraments; indeed the Catholic Church sees human existence as having as its whole purpose the acquisition, preservation and intensification of this supernatural life. 

Eastern Orthodox Church

The Church of Jesus Christ of Latter-day Saints

The Church of Jesus Christ of Latter-day Saints (LDS Church or Mormons), which believes itself to be the restored Church of Jesus Christ, believes in apotheosis along the lines of the Christian tradition of divinization or deification but refers to it as exaltation, or eternal life, and considers it to be accomplished by "sanctification". They believe that people may live with God throughout eternity in families and eventually become gods themselves but remain subordinate to God the Father, Jesus Christ, and the Holy Spirit. While the primary focus of the LDS Church is on Jesus of Nazareth and his atoning sacrifice for man, Latter-day Saints believe that one purpose for Christ's mission and for his atonement is the exaltation or Christian deification of man. The third Article of Faith of The Church of Jesus Christ of Latter-day Saints states that all men may be saved from sin by the atonement of Jesus Christ, and LDS Gospel Doctrine (as published) states that all men will be saved and will be resurrected from death. However, only those who are sufficiently obedient and accept the atonement and the grace and mercy of Jesus Christ before the resurrection and final judgment will be "exalted" and receive a literal Christian deification.

One popular Latter-day Saint quote, often attributed to the early Church leader Lorenzo Snow in 1837, is "As man now is, God once was: As God now is, man may be." Many Latter-day Saint and gentile scholars also have discussed the correlation between Latter-day Saint belief in exaltation and the ancient Christian theosis, or deification, as set forth by early Church Fathers. Several Latter-day Saint and gentile historians specializing in studies of the early Christian Church also claim that the Latter-day Saint belief in eternal progression is more similar to the ancient Christian deification as set forth in numerous patristic writings of the 1st to 4th centuries AD than the beliefs of any other modern faith group of the Christian tradition.

Members of the Church believe that the original Christian belief in man's divine potential gradually lost its meaning and importance in the centuries after the death of the apostles, as doctrinal changes by post-apostolic theologians caused Christians to lose sight of the true nature of God and his purpose for creating humanity. The concept of God's nature that was eventually accepted as Christian doctrine in the 4th century set divinity apart from humanity by defining the Godhead as three persons sharing a common divine substance. That classification of God in terms of a substance is not found in scripture (the wording of the Council of Constantinople (360) prohibited use of the terms "substance," "essence," and "ousia" since they were not included in the scriptures) but, in many aspects, mirrored the Greek metaphysical philosophies that are known to have influenced the thinking of Church Fathers such as Justin Martyr, Origen, and Augustine. Latter-day Saints teach that by modern revelation, God restored the knowledge that he is the literal father of our spirits (Hebrews 12:9) and that the Biblical references to God creating mankind in his image and likeness are in no way allegorical. As such, Mormons assert that as the literal offspring of God the Father (Acts 17:28–29), humans have the potential to be heirs of his glory and co-heirs with Christ (Romans 8:16-17). The glory, Mormons believe, lies not in God's substance but in his intelligence: in other words, light and truth (Doctrine and Covenants 93:36). Thus, the purpose of humans is to grow and progress to become like the Father in Heaven. Mortality is seen as a crucial step in the process in which God's spirit children gain a body, which, though formed in the image of the Father's body, is subject to pain, illness, temptation, and death. The purpose of this earth life is to learn to choose the right in the face of that opposition, thereby gaining essential experience and wisdom. The level of intelligence we attain in this life will rise in the Resurrection (Doctrine and Covenants 130:18–19). Bodies will then be immortal like those of the Father and the Son (Philippians 3:21), but the degree of glory to which each person will resurrect is contingent upon the Final Judgment (Revelation 20:13, 1 Corinthians 15:40–41). Those who are worthy to return to God's presence can continue to progress towards a fullness of God's glory, which Mormons refer to as eternal life, or exaltation (Doctrine and Covenants 76).

The Latter-day Saint concept of apotheosis/exaltation is expressed in Latter-day scriptures (Mosiah 3:19, Alma 13:12, D&C 78:7, D&C 78:22, D&C 84:4, D&C 84:23, D&C 88:68, D&C 93:28) and is expressed by a member of the Quorum of the Twelve Apostles: "Though stretched by our challenges, by living righteously and enduring well we can eventually become sufficiently more like Jesus in our traits and attributes, that one day we can dwell in the Father's presence forever and ever" (Neal Maxwell, October 1997).

In early 2014, the Church of Jesus Christ of Latter-day Saints published an essay on the official church website specifically addressing the foundations, history, and official beliefs regarding apotheosis. The essay addresses the scriptural foundations of this belief, teachings of the early Church Fathers on the subject of deification, and the teachings of modern Church leaders, starting with Joseph Smith.

Wesleyan Protestantism

Distinctively, in Wesleyan Protestantism theosis sometimes implies the doctrine of entire sanctification which teaches, in summary, that it is the Christian's goal, in principle possible to achieve, to live without any (voluntary) sin (Christian perfection). Wesleyan theologians detect the influence on Wesley from the Eastern Fathers, who saw the drama of salvation leading to the deification (apotheosis) of the human, in order that the perfection that originally part of human nature in creation but distorted by the fall might bring fellowship with the divine.

In art

In art the matter is practical: the elevation of a figure to divine level, or being welcomed to Heaven, entails certain conventions. So it is that the apotheosis genre exists in Christian art as in other art. The features of the apotheosis genre may be seen in subjects that emphasize Christ's divinity (Transfiguration, Ascension, Christ Pantocrator) and that depict holy persons "in glory"—that is, in their roles as "God revealed" (Assumption, Ascension, etc.).

 

Later artists have used the concept for motives ranging from genuine respect for the deceased (Constantino Brumidi's fresco The Apotheosis of Washington on the dome of the United States Capitol Building in Washington, D.C.), to artistic comment (Salvador Dalí's or Ingres's The Apotheosis of Homer), to mock-heroic and burlesque apotheoses for comedic effect.

Many modern leaders have exploited the artistic imagery if not the theology of apotheosis. Examples include Rubens's depictions of James I of England at the Banqueting House (an expression of the Divine Right of Kings) or Henry IV of France, or Appiani's apotheosis of Napoleon. The C. H. Niehaus-designed Apotheosis of St. Louis (Louis IX of France) became a symbol for St. Louis MO. The term has come to be used figuratively to refer to the elevation of a dead leader (often one who was assassinated and/or martyred) to a kind of superhuman charismatic figure and an effective erasing of all faults and controversies which were connected with his name in life—for example, Abraham Lincoln in the US, Lenin in the USSR, Yitzchak Rabin in Israel, or Kim Jong-il in North Korea.

In musicApotheosis in music refers to the appearance of a theme in grand or exalted form. It represents the musical equivalent of the apotheosis genre in visual art, especially where the theme is connected in some way with historical persons or dramatic characters. When crowning the end of a large-scale work the apotheosis functions as a peroration, following an analogy with the art of rhetoric.

Apotheosis moments abound in music, and the word itself appears in some cases. François Couperin wrote two apotheoses, one for Arcangelo Corelli (Le Parnasse, ou L'Apothéose de Corelli), and one for Jean Baptiste Lully (L'Apothéose de Lully). Hector Berlioz used "Apotheose" as the title of the final movement of his Grande symphonie funèbre et triomphale, a work composed in 1846 for the dedication of a monument to France's war dead. Two of  Pyotr Ilyich Tchaikovsky's ballets, The Sleeping Beauty and The Nutcracker, contain apotheoses as finales; the same is true of Ludwig Minkus's La Bayadère. Igor Stravinsky composed two ballets, Apollo and Orpheus, which both contain episodes entitled "Apotheose". The concluding tableau of Maurice Ravel's Ma mère l'Oye is also titled  "Apotheose." Czech composer Karel Husa, concerned in 1970 about arms proliferation and environmental deterioration, named his musical response Apotheosis for This Earth. Aram Khachaturian entitled a segment of his ballet Spartacus "Sunrise and Apotheosis." Richard Wagner, referring to the lively rhythms which permeate Ludwig van Beethoven's Symphony No. 7, called it the "apotheosis of the dance".  Alexander Glazunov's ballet The Seasons, Op.67 has as the concluding movement:-  Autumn: Scene and Apotheosis.

Musical theater has a tendency to use apotheosis often, although that can become easily confused with motif (narrative)s. One meta example of this is The Guy Who Didn't Like Musicals, where musical theater itself is deified by the characters within the play, excluding the titular character.

In poetry
Samuel Menashe (1925–2011) wrote a poem entitled Apotheosis, as did Barbara Kingsolver. Emily Dickinson (1830–1886) wrote Love, Poem 18: Apotheosis. The poet Dejan Stojanović's Dancing of Sounds contains the line, "Art is apotheosis." Paul Laurence Dunbar wrote a poem entitled Love's Apotheosis. Samuel Taylor Coleridge wrote a poem entitled "The Apotheosis, or the Snow-Drop" in 1787.

In science
In an essay entitled The Limitless Power of Science, Peter Atkins described science as an apotheosis, writing: Science, above all, respects the power of the human intellect. Science is the apotheosis of the intellect and the consummation of the Renaissance. Science respects more deeply the potential of humanity than religion ever can.

Anthropolatry

Anthropolatry or anthropotheism are words defined as the deification and worship of humans. It was practiced in ancient Japan towards their emperors. Followers of Socinianism were later accused of practicing anthropolatry. Anthropologist Ludwig Feuerbach professed a religion to worship all human beings while Auguste Comte venerated only individuals who made positive contributions and excluded those who did not.

See also

 Amaterasu
 Charismatic authority
 Cult of personality
 Divinization (Christian)
 Euhemerus
 Exaltation (Mormonism)
 Incarnation
 James Frazer, The Golden Bough Robert Graves, The White Goddess Hirohito
 Idolatry
 Imperial cult
 List of people who have been considered deities
 Roman emperor
 Religion in ancient Rome
 Sacred king
 Theosis (Eastern Orthodox theology)
 Edward Burnett Tylor

References

Further reading
 Boak, Arthur E.R. "The Theoretical Basis of the Deification of Rulers in Antiquity", in: Classical Journal vol. 11, 1916, pp. 293–297.
 Bömer, Franz. "Ahnenkult und Ahnenglaube im alten Rom", Leipzig 1943.
 Burkert, Walter. "Caesar und Romulus-Quirinus", in: Historia vol. 11, 1962, pp. 356–376.
 Engels, David. "Postea dictus est inter deos receptus. Wetterzauber und Königsmord: Zu den Hintergründen der Vergöttlichung frührömischer Könige", in: Gymnasium vol 114, 2007, pp. 103–130.

 Kalakaua, David. "The Apotheosis of Pele: The Adventures of the Goddess with Kamapuaa" in The Legends and Myths of Hawaii King, Stephen. "The Dark Tower: The Gunslinger Liou-Gille, Bernadette. "Divinisation des morts dans la Rome ancienne", in: Revue Belge de Philologie vol. 71, 1993, pp. 107–115.
 Richard, Jean-Claude. "Énée, Romulus, César et les funérailles impériales", in:Mélanges de l'École française de Rome vol. 78, 1966, pp. 67–78.
 Subin, Anna Della. Accidental Gods: On Men Unwittingly Turned Divine'', Granta (expected January 2022)

External links

 'Living with Gods': BBC Four Thought talk with Anna Della Subin, author of Accidental Gods, 16 January 2020
 Seneca's Apocolocyntosis at Project Gutenberg
 François Couperin. "L'Apothéose de Corelli" and "L'Apothéose de Lully" at IMSLP

Ancient Roman religion
Religious belief and doctrine
 
Metamorphosis in folklore